Jean-Henri-Guillaume Krombach, also known as Johann Heinrich Wilhelm Krombach (16 September 1791 in Moers – 23 February 1881 in Luxembourg City) was a German-Luxembourgian pharmacist and botanist.

He initially worked as an assistant pharmacist in a number of German cities (Soest, Mainz and Aachen), then in 1815 relocated as a pharmacist to Diekirch, Luxembourg. From 1850 he served as a pharmacist in the nearby town of Ettelbruck.

Beginning in 1830 he taught classes in natural sciences at schools in Diekirch and Ettelbruck. In 1871 he was named president of the Société de botanique du Grand-Duché de Luxembourg.

In 1875, he published "Flore du grand-duché de Luxembourg. Plantes phanérogames" (Flora of the Grand Duchy of Luxembourg; phanerogams). He is the taxonomic authority of the subtribe Olyrinae (family Poaceae).

References 

1791 births
1881 deaths
People from Moers
German pharmacists
Luxembourgian botanists
Luxembourgian pharmacists